Foyle was a single member constituency in the Parliament of Northern Ireland. It was created in 1929 as one of the five single-member constituencies replacing the former five-member Londonderry constituency. The constituency continued in existence until the Parliament was temporarily suspended in 1972, and then formally abolished in 1973.

The seat was held continuously by nationalist candidates and never even contested by unionists, although labour movement candidates sometimes polled well.

Members of Parliament
1929 – 1937: James Joseph McCarroll, Nationalist Party
1937 – 1953: Patrick Maxwell, Nationalist Party
1953 – 1969: Eddie McAteer, Nationalist Party
1969 – 1972: John Hume, Independent Nationalist (1969–70); Social Democratic and Labour Party (1970–72)

Election results

At the 1929 Northern Ireland general election, James Joseph McCarroll was elected unopposed.

At the 1937 Foyle by-election and the 1938 Northern Ireland general election, Patrick Maxwell was elected unopposed.

At the 1949 Northern Ireland general election, Patrick Maxwell was elected unopposed.

References
Northern Ireland Parliamentary Election Results: Boroughs: Londonderry

Constituencies of the Northern Ireland Parliament
Historic constituencies in County Londonderry
Northern Ireland Parliament constituencies established in 1929
Northern Ireland Parliament constituencies disestablished in 1973